Borovaya is a rural locality (a selo) in Starooskolsky District, Belgorod Oblast, Russia. The population was 68 as of 2010. There is 1 street.

Geography 
Borovaya is located 52 km southeast of Stary Oskol (the district's administrative centre) by road. Vysoky is the nearest rural locality.

References 

Rural localities in Starooskolsky District